The Last Domino? Tour was a concert tour by English rock band Genesis, staged following the announcement of their reunion after a 13-year hiatus. It featured the core trio of keyboardist Tony Banks, drummer/singer Phil Collins, and bassist/guitarist Mike Rutherford, the most commercially successful line-up in the band's history, with Daryl Stuermer on guitars and bass, and Collins's son Nic on drums.

The tour comprised 47 shows across Europe and North America between 20 September 2021 and 26 March 2022, marking the first Genesis performances since the trio reunited for the Turn It On Again Tour in 2007. The UK leg was rescheduled three times due to the COVID-19 pandemic, with the London gigs rescheduled a fourth time.

Background
Genesis last saw activity in 2007 when Phil Collins reunited with Tony Banks and Mike Rutherford to reform the trio line-up after a failed attempt to reunite with past members Peter Gabriel and Steve Hackett. They completed the Turn It On Again Tour, after which the group entered a 13-year hiatus. During this time, Gabriel, Hackett, and original guitarist Anthony Phillips reunited with the three core members for the 2014 BBC documentary, Genesis: Together and Apart. Since 2011, the five have expressed mixed opinions about a reunion of the five-piece line-up of the band. A return to group activity became possible when Collins ended a five-year retirement from music in 2015 and embarked on his Not Dead Yet Tour, which ended in October 2019 and featured his teenage son Nic Collins on drums. After attending a show in London, Banks and Rutherford expressed an interest in touring with Collins again. Later in the tour, Rutherford joined Collins on stage to perform the Genesis song "Follow You Follow Me". Collins said that The Last Domino? Tour was his final with the group. Banks was open to the band continuing, depending on how the members and the audience received the tour, though he later said that after the 2022 dates, "that will be it."

Development

Rehearsals
On 22 January 2020, the trio were spotted at a basketball game in New York City, which prompted speculations of a potential reunion. Banks said later that the band had spent some time in the city to discuss the possibility of another tour, while publicly claiming they were together just for a mutual friend's wedding. Banks said that Gabriel and Hackett had not been contacted to participate, reasoning the difficulty in getting Gabriel on board to do the tour. Rehearsals took place with Nic Collins and Genesis's longtime live guitarist Daryl Stuermer. The first songs they played were "Land of Confusion" and "No Son of Mine" as they were considered not technically difficult. Banks praised Nic's drumming style, which he compared to a young Phil, and said his approach gave the group the opportunity to perform songs that they had previously avoided. Rutherford was pleased with the sound that they achieved during these sessions, which he compared as darker to his side group, Mike + the Mechanics, and picked the instrumental sections as particularly strong. American musician Dave Kerzner, who had assisted Banks with his keyboard rig for the 2007 tour, was hired to update Banks's set-ups with longtime Genesis associates, technical assistant Geoff Callingham and producer Nick Davis.

The success of the initial try-outs in New York City led to the group's decision to enter full production rehearsals in October and November 2020, which were planned to take place in Miami, Florida before they relocated to LH2 Studios in west London. Prog magazine received permission to attend a session and photographed the group at work. Patrick Woodroffe, who had worked on the 2007 tour, was rehired as show director. The stage design involves a lighting system, a large video screen, and fog effects to interpret the music. As Woodroffe had previously worked with Genesis and befriended the group, he had a clear idea as to what kind of lighting would suit them and knew that they are "musicians first and foremost." At the time of the London rehearsals, Genesis had worked through as many as 24 songs for a proposed two-hour show. A typical daily schedule involved a brief sound check, followed by the group performing the entire set without a break, partly to help Collins strengthen his vocals. Woodroffe and his team observed the production and made notes on any necessary changes to lighting or video cues. The band agreed to have a "very little" amount of live shots of members performing on the screen to place greater emphasis on the visuals. On the final two days of production rehearsals, a 20-person film crew were hired to film Genesis performing the set.

Rolling Stone reported that the setlist was "a closely-guarded secret". At the time of the tour's announcement, Collins said that songs "based more on my drumming" would not be performed, and he added that despite his inability to play the drums due to ill health, "I'll be doing my best to play some bits" alongside Nic. Nic Collins said the group rehearsed songs that he had "known for ages" and was familiar with "Firth of Fifth" and "I Know What I Like (In Your Wardrobe)" from Selling England by the Pound (1973), but he had to learn songs he was also unfamiliar with, a process which made him a bigger Genesis fan than before. He revealed that "Los Endos" from A Trick of the Tail (1976) and the final ten minutes of the 23-minute epic "Supper's Ready" from Foxtrot (1972) were rehearsed, but did not say if they were chosen in the final running order. The tour was the band's first not to feature material from A Trick of the Tail since its release.

Tour announcement and dates
On 3 March 2020, BBC Radio 2 advertised on Twitter that "a massive band" is to announce their reunion on the following morning's edition of The Radio 2 Breakfast Show with host Zoe Ball. The trio were revealed as live guests and announced their reformation and the tour, which initially comprised 10 dates in Ireland and the UK between 16 November and 11 December 2020. The tour is named after the second part of the song "Domino" from Invisible Touch (1986). Banks suggested to add the question mark at the end. Earlier that week, a picture of the trio was posted on the group's official Instagram page with the caption: "And then there were three.", a reference to ...And Then There Were Three... (1978), their first album recorded as a three-piece.

Pre-sale tickets went on sale at on 5 March 2020 for O2 Priority and Live Nation members, followed by a general sale on 6 March from 9 a.m. The first wave of general sale tickets sold out within ten minutes, which prompted the addition of six dates after one hour to meet demand. One extra show was added in Liverpool, Newcastle, Leeds, Birmingham, Manchester, and Glasgow, bringing the total number of shows to 16. On 9 March a second show in Dublin, scheduled for 17 November, was added. On 24 July 2020, the tour was rescheduled due to the COVID-19 pandemic with the new dates taking place between 1 and 30 April 2021. On the same day, an additional date in Birmingham on 7 April and in London on 30 April was added, bringing the total number to 19. On 22 January 2021, the 19 shows were rescheduled once more, this time from 15 September to 13 October. On the same day, Genesis released a 50-second preview video of the filmed rehearsals, revealing their chosen stage design. The video revealed the group playing the opening to "Behind the Lines" from Duke (1980) and, for the first time in their history, performing with two backing vocalists.

In April 2021, Rutherford said that dates in the United States are possible for late 2021 and that the group "are confident, they want to do it." On 29 April, the band announced 14 dates in the United States and Canada between 15 November and 15 December, with pre-sale tickets going on sale on 7 May, followed by general sale on 9 May, only through Ticketmaster. This brought the total number of concerts to 33. On 6 May, an extra show in Chicago, Montreal, and New York City was added due to demand, followed by an extra show in Philadelphia and Boston on 10 May. A second date in Toronto was added on 25 May. In June, the band's first ever date in Raleigh, North Carolina was announced for 19 November, bringing the total number of shows to 40.

In September 2021, the three dates in Ireland and Northern Ireland were postponed indefinitely due to the pandemic. On 8 October, the last four dates of the UK leg were postponed after Rutherford tested positive for COVID-19. The three London shows were rescheduled for 24–26 March 2022. Due to demand, Genesis announced an extra date for December 11, 2021 at the Barclays Center in New York City, however, the show was later cancelled, with the official reason given at the time being "unforeseen circumstances", however, multiple sources later told Billboard that technical difficulties with the venue's then-ticketing outlet, SeatGeek, and lower than expected tickets sales were the reason for the cancelation, which were cited as a reason for the venue ending their partnership with SeatGeek earlier than expected. On 25 October 2021, Genesis announced a European leg covering Germany, France, and the Netherlands between 7–22 March 2022. Those shows were followed by the three rescheduled dates in London, bringing the total number of shows to 47. The final show, held on 26 March 2022, marked the 46th anniversary of the first Genesis concert with Collins as lead vocalist, which took place in London, Ontario in 1976. (This date was also the 13th anniversary of the passing of former Genesis drummer John Mayhew.) Gabriel and Genesis' former tour manager Richard Macphail were present backstage.

Compilation album and documentary
On 29 July 2021, Genesis announced a companion greatest hits album, The Last Domino? – The Hits, containing the studio versions of songs released between 1973 and 1991. The set was released on 17 September.

On 1 September 2021, a one-hour documentary covering the rehearsals and the band preparing for the tour became available on various PBS television stations in the United States. It features band interviews, behind the scenes footage, and live performances of various songs from the professionally filmed set in late 2020. The documentary aired in the UK on Sky Arts on 12 September, and had a DVD release on 2 November.

Gross
The 2021 dates alone saw Genesis sell 134,323 tickets and gross $23,743,403. The tour received a nomination for a Billboard Music Award in the Top Tour and Top Rock Tour categories, but it lost both to the No Filter Tour by The Rolling Stones.

Setlist
Main set
"Duke's Intro" ("Behind the Lines"/"Duke's End")
"Turn It On Again"
"Mama"
"Land of Confusion"
"Home by the Sea"
"Second Home by the Sea"
Medley:
"Fading Lights" 
"The Cinema Show" 
"Afterglow"
"That's All" 
"The Lamb Lies Down on Broadway" 
"Follow You Follow Me" 
"Duchess" 
"No Son of Mine"
"Firth of Fifth" 
"I Know What I Like (In Your Wardrobe)"
"Domino"
"Throwing It All Away" 
"Tonight, Tonight, Tonight" 
"Invisible Touch"
Encores:
"I Can't Dance"
 "Dancing with the Moonlit Knight" 
 "The Carpet Crawlers"

Tour dates

Cancelled shows

Band members
Genesis
Tony Banks – keyboards
Phil Collins – lead vocals
Mike Rutherford – guitar, bass, bass pedals

Additional musicians
Nic Collins – drums, percussion 
Daryl Stuermer – guitar
Daniel Pearce – backing vocals
Patrick Smyth – backing vocals

Notes

References

Sources

2021 concert tours
2022 concert tours
Genesis (band) concert tours